Diospyros pilosanthera is a tree in the family Ebenaceae. The twigs are slender to stout. Inflorescences bear up to 12 flowers. The specific epithet  is from the Latin meaning "with pilose or hairy anthers". Habitat is forests from sea level to  altitude. D. pilosanthera is found from Indochina to Malesia.

References

pilosanthera
Plants described in 1837
Trees of Indo-China
Trees of Malesia
Taxa named by Francisco Manuel Blanco